The 2013 Red Deer municipal election was held Monday, October 21, 2013. The citizens of Red Deer, Alberta, elected one mayor, eight councillors (all at large) to the Red Deer City Council, the seven Red Deer School District No. 104 trustees (at large), and five of the Red Deer Catholic Regional Division No. 39's seven trustees (as Red Deer Ward). The election also featured a non-binding plebiscite about adopting a city council ward system.

From 1968 to 2013, provincial legislation has required every municipality to hold elections every three years. The Legislative Assembly of Alberta passed a bill on December 5, 2012, amending the Local Authorities Election Act. Starting with the 2013 elections, officials are elected for a four-year term, and municipal elections are moved to a four-year cycle. Incumbent three-term Mayor Morris Flewwelling retired following the election, two councillors ran for the vacant seat. Of the 63,979 eligible voters, only 20,364 turned in a ballot, a voter turnout of 31.8%.

Candidates
Bold indicates elected, italics indicates incumbent.

Mayor

William Horn - taxi driver
Cindy Jefferies - incumbent councillor
Chad Mason - accounting
Dennis Trepanier
Tara Veer - incumbent councillor

Councillors

Jerry Anderson - retired businessman
Terry Balgobin - business owner
Bob Bevins - business owner
Buck Buchanan - incumbent councillor
Matt Chapin - community volunteer
Serge Gingras - college instructor
Calvin Goulet-Jones - business owner
Tanya Handley
Paul Harris - incumbent councillor
David Helm - grain farmer
Ken Johnston - bank manager
Lawrence Lee - incumbent public school board trustee
Dan McKenna - casino gaming consultant
Victor Mobley - Agricultural Partsperson
Dawna Morey
Lynne Mulder - incumbent councillor
Janella Spearing
Troy Wavercan - computer technician
Jonathan Wieler - business owner
Frank Wong - incumbent councillor
Dianne Wyntjes - incumbent councillor
Darren Young - information technology manager

Public school trustees

Separate school trustees

Plebiscite 
Red Deer City Council approved a non-binding plebiscite question and choices on May 27, 2013.

References

External links
The City of Red Deer: Election 2013

2013 Alberta municipal elections
2013